Alongside Night is a 2014 film directed by J. Neil Schulman and starring Kevin Sorbo. It is an adaptation of the 1979 novel Alongside Night by Schulman.

Cast

Production 
The film was independently produced by several prominent libertarians, including Austin Petersen and Rich Iott. The film was shot entirely in Las Vegas and Henderson, Nevada, with principal photography lasting two years. Some scenes were shot at area libertarian and sci-fi conventions.

The cast stars Kevin Sorbo as Martin Vreeland, Christian Kramme as Elliot, Reid Cox as Lorimer, Sam Sorbo as Cathryn, and Jake Busey as The President. Several members of the science fiction and libertarian community were involved in the production and make on-screen appearances; including Star Trek actors Tim Russ, Garrett Wang, and Gary Graham, author Brad Linaweaver, and activist Adam Kokesh.

The production completed in 2013.

Differences from novel 
The film makes several changes to the source material, updated with current references and technology. The location changes from New York city to Las Vegas, and the character of Maureen Fischer was changed to a man named Murray Konkin (named for Samuel Edward Konkin as well as his intellectual progenitor, Murray Rothbard.)

Premiere and distribution 
The film premiered July 14, 2014 at the Lumiere Music Hall in Beverly Hills, California, played in limited theatrical release from Tugg.com, released for streaming on iTunes in 2014, was released July 8, 2015 as a Blu-ray/DVD Combo Pack, and released in 2015 for streaming on Amazon Video and Amazon Prime.

References

External links 
 
 
 Alongside Night – Official Movie Website
 Alongside Night – Movie Page on Facebook
 Alongside Night Short Videos – YouTube Short Video Play List

Anarchist fiction
Libertarian science fiction
2014 independent films
2014 science fiction films
American dystopian films
American science fiction films
American independent films
Films shot in the Las Vegas Valley